The orange-bellied leafbird (Chloropsis hardwickii) is a bird native to the central and eastern Himalayas, Yunnan and northern parts of Southeast Asia. The greyish-crowned leafbird, which is found in Hainan, was formerly considered conspecific. The scientific name commemorates the English naturalist Thomas Hardwicke.

Description 
It is brightly coloured with an orange belly, a green back, a blue tail and flight feathers, and a black and blue patch over its throat and chest. It has a long, curved beak. It feeds on insects, spiders and nectar. Orange-bellied leafbirds make their nests from roots and fibers which are suspended from the edges of twigs at the end of a tree branch. They do not migrate.

References

Birds of the World by Colin Harrison and Alan Greensmith, Eyewitness Handbooks

orange-bellied leafbird
Birds of Bhutan
Birds of Nepal
Birds of Northeast India
Birds of Laos
Birds of Myanmar
Birds of Thailand
Birds of Yunnan
orange-bellied leafbird
Taxa named by Sir William Jardine
orange-bellied leafbird